The Justice Party held a leadership election between 6 and 18 July 2015. It was an election to elect a new leader as Cheon Ho-sun fulfilled his two-year term of office.

Candidates

Running 
 Roh Hoe-chan, former member of the National Assembly.
 Noh Hang-rae
 Sim Sang-jung, member of the National Assembly, former floor leader of the party.
 Cho Sung-joo

Results 
The election was held only by the votes of the party members. The first round of voting was held from 6 to 11 July 2015. Candidate Roh Hoe-chan and Sim Sang-jung, who won the first and second votes respectively, entered the final vote. The final round of voting was held from 11 to 18 July 2015.

References 

Justice Party (South Korea)
Justice
Justice